The Madeira Nature Reserve covers about two thirds of the area of Madeira Island. It was created in 1982.

Main Protected Areas in the Madeira Nature Reserve 
Ilhas Desertas Nature Reserve
Ilhas Selvagens Nature Reserve
Parcial do Garajau Nature Reserve
Rocha do Navio Nature Reserve

References 

Madeira Island
Geography of Madeira
Environment of Madeira
Protected areas of Portugal